Cucumis ficifolius is a dioecious flowering  vine in the family Cucurbitaceae.

Distribution
Cucumis ficifolius is native to Africa and is found from Mauritania south to Ghana and Ivory Coast and east to the Horn of Africa and Tanzania, as well as in South Africa, Angola, southern Mozambique, and the Sinai Peninsula.

Description
It is normally a prostrate plant with coarse, hairy stems and leaves. The leaf shape is ovate in outline and weakly cordate or subtruncate at the base and has 3-5 rounded lobes. The flowers occur solitarily and in males have yellow petals that measure 4-7 millimeters long each and in females measure 5-9 millimeters long each. The fruit is ovate and measures 23-50 millimeters (0.9-1.9 inches) in length and is green-yellow in color and is covered in small pustules that may look similar to spikes. The entire plant (stems, leaves, fruits, roots) is poisonous upon ingestion.

See also
Cucumis
List of Cucurbitales of South Africa

References

ficifolius
Plants described in 1851
Taxa named by Achille Richard
Flora of Africa
Vines
Dioecious plants